DAF or Daf may refer to:

Business and organizations
 DAF Bus International, Netherlands, later VDL Bus & Coach
 DAF Car BV, later VDL Nedcar
 DAF Trucks, truck manufacturer headquartered in Eindhoven, Netherlands
 DAF NV, former holding company of DAF Trucks and Leyland DAF
 DAF Trucks (cycling team) (UCI team code: DAF), former Belgian professional team sponsored by DAF Trucks
 Leyland DAF, former commercial vehicle manufacturer
 Danish Artist Union (Dansk Artist Forbund), a trade union in Denmark
 Deutsche Arbeitsfront ("German Labour Front"), Nazi Germany's labor organization
 Donor advised fund, an investment vehicle for charitable giving

People
 Mohamed Daf (born 1994), Senegalese footballer
 Omar Daf (born 1977), Senegalese former football player
 Daf Hobson (born 1951), English cinematographer
 Daf Palfrey (born 1973), Welsh director, producer and writer.

Military
 United States Department of the Air Force
 Desert Air Force, World War II Royal Air Force unit
 Defectors from the French army to the ALN, a faction within the Algerian army
 Djibouti Air Force

Music
 Daf, a percussion instrument
 Deutsch Amerikanische Freundschaft (D.A.F.), a German elektropunk band
 "D.A.F." (song), by Powderfinger

Science and technology
 Decay-accelerating factor, a protein encoded by the CD55 gene
 Delayed Auditory Feedback, extending the time between speech and hearing
 Directed attention fatigue, a neuro-psychological phenomenon
 Dissolved air flotation, a water treatment process
 Dynamic amplification factor in structural dynamics
 Dual Pixel CMOS AF, a technology in the Canon EOS 7D Mark II camera

Other uses
 Diamonds Are Forever (novel), 1956 novel by Ian Fleming
 Diamonds Are Forever (film), 1971 James Bond film 
 Diamonds Are Forever (soundtrack), soundtrack to the film made by John Barry with a title song sung by Shirley Bassey
 Daf, a double-sided page, frequently referring to a folio of the Babylonian Talmud
 daf, retired ISO:639-3 code for the Dan language, Africa
 DAF, FAA location identifier for Necedah Airport, Wisconsin, US
 DAF, IATA code for Duap Airport, Papua New Guinea
 Delivered At Frontier, Incoterm for a named place of delivery

See also
 DAFS (disambiguation)
 Daaf Drok (1914–2002), Dutch footballer
 Daaf or David Baan (1908–1984), Dutch boxer